Mount Dandenong (Aboriginal Woiwurrung language: Corhanwarrabul) is a mountain that is part of the Dandenong Ranges of the Great Dividing Range, located in the Central District of Victoria, Australia.

Geology

The mountain is the remains of a massive and explosive volcanic eruption over 300 million years ago. This has left the ranges spread between Coldstream, Emerald and south of Ferntree Gully.

Features
At Mount Dandenong are parks, forests, an arboretum, numerous lookout and many restaurants.

Lookout

Close to the summit of the mountain sits the SkyHigh Mount Dandenong restaurant, gardens and maze, re-opened in 2005.

On a clear day it is possible to see across the metropolitan area to the You Yangs and Mount Macedon, putting the Melbourne Central Business District and Port Phillip Bay into a broader geographical context.

The summit

The peak of the mountain, at 633 m above sea level, is also the site of the television and FM radio signal towers for the greater Melbourne area, which range in height from 72 m to 180 m. These towers are visible from quite a distance and distinguish Mount Dandenong from others in the Dandenong Ranges.

Tourist road
Mount Dandenong Tourist Road, the main road going through Mount Dandenong, is host to many local shops. These include cafes, restaurants and eateries, pubs, day spas, wine and fine food purveyors, a nursery and many shops selling local crafts.

William Ricketts Sanctuary

The William Ricketts Sanctuary is situated on the east face of Mount Dandenong. It has over 93 ceramic sculptures woven into the eucalyptus forest.

See also

List of mountains in Victoria
1938 Kyeema crash

References

Mountains of Victoria (Australia)
Volcanism of Australia
Paleozoic volcanism